List of colleges in Ho Chi Minh City, Vietnam, the italic part is in Vietnamese language.
Cetana PSB Intellis International College 
College of Technology & Business Administration (Cao đẳng Bán công Công nghệ & Quản trị doanh nghiệp)
College of Marketing (Cao đẳng Bán công Marketing)
College of Foodstuff Process (Cao đẳng Công nghệ Thực phẩm)
College of Industry IV (Cao đẳng Công nghiệp IV)
College of Information Technology (Cao đẳng Dân lập Công nghệ thông tin)
College of Transportation 3 (Cao đẳng Giao thông Vận tải 3)
College of Foreign Trade (Cao đẳng Kinh tế đối ngoại)
College of Economics and Industrial Engineering (Cao đẳng Kinh tế Kỹ thuật Công nghiệp)
College of Technology (Cao đẳng Kỹ nghệ dân lập)
Technical College of VINHEMPICH (Cao đẳng Kỹ thuật VINHEMPICH)
College of Dramatics and Cinematics (Cao đẳng Sân khấu Điện ảnh Thành phố Hồ Chí Minh)
College of Kindergarten Teacher Training (Cao đẳng Sư phạm Mẫu giáo TW3)
College of Physical Training TW2 (Cao đẳng Sư phạm Thể dục TW2)
College of Teacher Training of Ho Chi Minh City (Cao đẳng Sư phạm Thành phố Hồ Chí Minh)
College of Finance and Accounting IV (Cao đẳng Tài chính Kế toán IV)
College of Culture and Arts of Ho Chi Minh City (Cao đẳng Văn hóa Nghệ thuật Thành phố Hồ Chí Minh)
College of Culture of Ho Chi Minh City (Cao đẳng Văn hóa Thành phố Hồ Chí Minh)
College of Civil Construction 2 (Cao đẳng Xây dựng số 2)

See also
List of universities in Ho Chi Minh City

Colleges in Ho Chi Minh City
Education in Ho Chi Minh City